The following events related to sociology occurred in the 1930s.

1930
Sigmund Freud's Civilization and Its Discontents is published.
Maurice Halbwachs' The Causes of Suicide is published.
Robert Redfield's Tepozltan: Life in a Mexican Village is published.
Clifford Shaw's The Jack Roller: A Delinquent Boy's Own Story is published.
Pitirim Sorokin's Rural Sociology is published.
Leon Trotsky's History of the Russian Revolution is published.
Founding of The Frankfurt School
Howard W. Obum serves as President of the ASA

1931
Marc Bloch's French Rural History is published.
Hans Freyer's Revolution of Right is published.
Robert Morrison MacIver's Sociology is published.
Alfred Radcliffe-Brown's Social organization of Australian tribes is published.
R.H. Tawney's Equality is published.
Emory S. Bogardus serves as president of the ASA.

Deaths
April 26: George Herbert Mead
June 11: Franklin H. Giddings
December 13: Gustave Le Bon

1932
Henri Bergson's The Two Sources of Morality and Religion is published.
George Elton Mayo's Human Problems of an Industrial Civilization is published.
Alfred Radcliffe-Brown's Social organization of Australian tribes is published.
R. H. Tawney's Land and Labour in China is published.
Beatrice Webb's and Sidney Webb's Methods of Social Study is published.

1933
Alexander Carr-Saunders' The Professions is published.
Friedrich Hayek's Monetary Theory and the Trade Cycle is published.
William F. Ogburn's Recent Social Trends in the United States is published.
Nazi party comes to power in Germany, many intellectuals flee, Ferdinand Tonnies is forced out his post as president of the German Society for Sociology and replaced by Hans Freyer

Births
 November 23: Ali Shariati

1934
Ruth Fulton Benedict's Patterns of Culture is published.
Alexander Carr-Saunders' A Century of Pauperism is published.
Morris Ginsberg's Sociology is published.
George Herbert Mead's Mind, Self and Society is published.
Hans Freyer suspends the activity of the German Society for Sociology.

Births
Moisés Espírito Santo

1935
Antonio Gramsci's The Prison Notebooks are published.
Harold Lasswell's Politics: Who Gets What, When, How is published.
Helen Merrell Lynd's Middletown: A study in Cultural Conflicts is published.
Bronislaw Malinowski's Coral Gardens and their Magic is published.
Karl Mannheim's Man and Society in an Age of Reconstruction is published.
Margaret Mead's Sex and Temperament in Three Primitive Societies is published.
Ferdinand Tönnies' Geist der Neuzeit is published.
Alfred Weber's Cultural History as Cultural Sociology is published.
Sidney Webb's and Beatrice Webb's Soviet communism : a new civilisation ? is published.

1936
Gaetano Mosca's History of Political Doctrines is published.
William F. Ogburn's The Social Effects of Aviation is published.
Robert E. Park's Human Ecology is published.
Edwin Sutherland's and H.J. Locke's 24,000 Homeless Men
Edward Alexander Westermarck's The Future of Marriage in Western Civilisation is published.
Ideology and Utopia, by Louis Wirth and Karl Mannheim, is published.
Henry P. Fairchild serves as president of the ASA.
The ASA begin publishing the American Sociological Review.

Deaths
April 9: Ferdinand Tönnies
April 27: Karl Pearson
May 3: Robert Michels
May 8: Oswald Spengler

1937
Sir Edward Evans-Pritchard's Witchcraft, Oracles and Magic among the Azande are published.
Talcott Parsons' The Structure of Social Action is published.
Leon Trotsky's The Revolution Betrayed is published.
William Lloyd Warner's A Black Civilization: A Social Study of an Australian Tribe is published.

1938
Chester Barnard's The Functions of the Executive is published.
Johann Huizinga's Homo Ludens is published.
Serafin N. Macaraig's An Introduction to Sociology is published.
Thomas Humphrey Marshall's Class Conflict and Social Stratification is published.
Thomas Humphrey Marshall's The Population Problem: The Experts and the Public is published.
Robert K. Merton's Social Structure and Anomie is published.
Werner Sombart's Vom Menschen is published.
Richard Titmuss's Poverty and Population is published.
Louis Wirth's Urbanism as a way of life is published.
Frank H. Hankins serves as president of the ASA.

Births
January 18: Anthony Giddens

Deaths
Paul Fauconnet

1939
Walter Benjamin's The Work of Art in the Age of its Technological Reproductibility is published.
Ruth Durant's Watling: A Social Survey is published.
Norbert Elias' The Civilizing Process is published.
Fei Xiaotong's Peasant Life in China: A Field Study of Country Life in the Yangtze Valley is published.
Edward Franklin Frazier's The Negro Family in the United States is published.
Sigmund Freud's Moses and Monotheism is published.
Alfred Radcliffe-Brown's Taboo is published.
George Lundberg's Foundations of Sociology is published.
Joseph Schumpeter's Business Cycles is published.
Richard Titmuss' Our Food Problem is published.

Sociology
Sociology timelines